Sefi Atta (born January 1964) is a Nigerian-American novelist, short-story writer, playwright and screenwriter. Her books have been translated into many languages, radio plays have been broadcast by the BBC, and her stage plays have been performed internationally.
Awards she has received include the 2006 Wole Soyinka Prize for Literature in Africa and the 2009 Noma Award for Publishing in Africa.

Biography
Atta was born in Lagos, Nigeria, in January 1964, to a family of five children. Her father Abdul-Aziz Atta was the Secretary to Federal Government and Head of the Civil Service until his death in 1972, and she was raised by her mother Iyabo Atta.

She attended Queen's College, Lagos, and Millfield School in England. In 1985, she graduated with a B.A. degree from Birmingham University. She qualified as a chartered accountant in England and as CPA in the United States, where she migrated in 1994. She earned an MFA in creative writing from Antioch University Los Angeles in 2001.

She is married to Gboyega Ransome-Kuti, a medical doctor, and son of Olikoye Ransome-Kuti, and they have one daughter, Temi.

Career 
Atta graduated from the creative writing program at Antioch University in Los Angeles. Her short stories have appeared in literary journals such as The Los Angeles Review, Mississippi Review and World Literature Today. Her articles on Lagos and Nigeria have appeared in publications such as Time and Libération. Her books have been translated into several languages. Her first novel, Everything Good Will Come, won the Wole Soyinka Prize for Literature in Africa.

Atta's Lagos-based production company Atta Girl supports Care to Read, a program she initiated to earn funds for legitimate charities through staged readings.

Bibliography 
Novels
 2005: Everything Good Will Come, US: Interlink Books, . UK: Myriad Editions, 
 2010: Swallow, Interlink Books, 
 2013: A Bit of Difference, Interlink Books, 
 2019: The Bead Collector, US: Interlink Books, . UK: Myriad Editions, 
 2022: The Bad Immigrant, Interlink Books, 

Short-story collections
 2010: News from Home, Interlink Books, 

Children's books
 2018: Drama Queen, Mango Books, Nigeria, 

Play collections
 2019: Sefi Atta; Selected Plays, Interlink Books, 

Stage play premieres
 2005: The Engagement, MUSON Centre, Lagos
 2011: The Cost of Living, Lagos Heritage Festival
 2011: Hagel auf Zamfara, Theatre Krefeld, Germany
 2012: The Naming Ceremony, New World Nigeria, Theatre Royal Stratford East, London
 2012: An Ordinary Legacy, The MUSON Festival, MUSON Centre, Lagos
 2014: Last Stand, Terra Kulture, Lagos
 2018: Renovation, The Jos Festival of Theatre
 2019: The Death Road, The Jos Festival of Theatre

Radio plays
 2002: The Engagement, BBC Radio
 2004: Makinwa's Miracle, BBC Radio
 2007: A Free Day, BBC Radio

Screenplays 
 2021: Swallow, a Netflix original movie based on Sefi Atta's second novel, Swallow, co-written by Atta and Kunle Afolayan, premiered on October 1.

Awards and recognitions 
 2002: Macmillan Writers Prize For Africa, shortlist
 2002: BBC African Performance, 2nd Prize
 2002: Zoetrope Short Fiction Contest, 3rd Prize
 2003: Red Hen Press Short Story Award, 1st prize
 2003: Glimmer Train′s Very Short Fiction Award, finalist
 2004: BBC African Performance, 2nd Prize
 2005: PEN International David TK Wong Prize, 1st Prize
 2006: Caine Prize for African Writing, shortlist
 2006: Wole Soyinka Prize for Literature in Africa
 2009: Noma Award for Publishing in Africa
 2009: The American Zoetrope Screenplay Competition, quarter-finalist 
 2019: WeScreenPlay Diverse Voices Lab, finalist 
 2019: The American Zoetrope Screenplay Competition, finalist
 2021: The National Playwrights Conference, semifinalist 

Visiting Writer
 2006: University of Southern Mississippi
 2008: Northwestern University
 2010: École Normale Supérieure de Lyon

Atta was on the jury for the 2010 Neustadt International Prize for Literature, and a judge for the 2019 Caine Prize for African Writing.

A critical study of her works, Writing Contemporary Nigeria: How Sefi Atta Illuminates African Culture and Tradition, edited by Professor Walter P. Collins, III, was published by Cambria Press in 2015.

References

External links
 Sefi Atta's website

Nigerian women novelists
Nigerian dramatists and playwrights
Nigerian expatriate academics in the United States
People educated at Millfield
1964 births
Living people
Writers from Lagos
Alumni of the University of Birmingham
Antioch University  alumni
University of Southern Mississippi people
Northwestern University faculty
Yoruba women writers
Queen's College, Lagos alumni
21st-century Nigerian novelists
English-language writers from Nigeria
Ransome-Kuti family
Yoruba women academics
Nigerian women academics
21st-century Nigerian women writers
Nigerian screenwriters
Nigerian writers